Perry E. Crosier (1890-1953) was an architect based in Minnesota, best known for the theatres he designed throughout Minnesota.  He also designed apartment complexes and residences.  Several of his works are listed on the National Register of Historic Places.

He was born November 17, 1890, in Minneapolis.  In 1909 he became a draftsman for Minneapolis architect Harry W. Jones. During 1910-13 he worked variously for architects Bertrand and Chamberlin, for a real estate firm, for a building contractor, and more.

He worked independently later.  His firm became Perry E. Crosier & Son, in 1946, when his son Paul joined.  He died in August 1953.

Works by "Perry Crosier" or "Perry Crosier and Son" include:

theatres in the Minneapolis-St. Paul area
Boulevard Twins Theatre (1939)
the Avalon Theatre (1937)
the St. Louis Park Theatre (1938)
the Hopkins Theatre (1941)
West Twins Theatre, West St. Paul.
In collaboration with Liebenberg & Kaplan:
the Westgate Theatre (1934)
the Cinema Theatre in Detroit Lakes, Minnesota
the Princess Theatre in Wabasha, Wisconsin
Village Theatre (1944–46) in Faribault, Minnesota

other theatres
Falls Theater (1933), 117 First Street S.E., Little Falls, Minnesota, a contributing building in the NRHP-listed Little Falls Commercial Historic District
Strand Theatre, 618 Hill Ave., Grafton, ND (Crosier, Perry E. and Son), NRHP-listed
Walla Theater, 909 Central Ave., Walhalla, ND (Crosier, Perry E. & Son), NRHP-listed
West Theatre, now The Tarlton Theatre (1941 converted to a theatre), in Green Bay, Wisconsin, in Art Deco and Art Moderne styles.

Other works include:
the Belmont, an apartment complex
the Oak Terrace, an apartment complex
the Fair Oaks (1939), an apartment complex
the Loring Medical Building (1926), Minneapolis.
Golden Valley Road apartments, North Minneapolis

He is reported to have designed  1211, 1215, 1221, 1227, and 1233 Russell Avenue North, and the Tazewell Apartments in St. Paul.

References

1890 births
1953 deaths
Businesspeople from Minneapolis
Architects from Minneapolis
20th-century American businesspeople